Mario Sarto (13 October 1885 – 13 September 1955) was an important sculptor of religious and commemorative art, renowned for the vast statuary present in the Monumental Cemetery of Bologna.

Many of his statues are also located in the main squares of Italian cities, among which Codigoro, Ferrara, Bologna, with representations of patron saints and heroic figures of the two World Wars.

Grandnephew of Giuseppe Melchiorre Sarto, Saint Pius X, he attended the Academy of Fine Arts of Brera in Milan, then opened his own studio in Bologna, where he lived and worked for the rest of his life.

References 

 "Mario Sarto", a conference at the Codigoro Municipal Library  Accessed 9 February 2012 
 Catalogue and book: Mario Sarto (1885-1955). Uno scultore codigorese tra Liberty e Novecento
 The Official Website of the Monumental Cemetery of Bologna with sculptures by di Mario Sarto
 The Monumental Cemetery of Bologna on it.Wikipedia
  Cataloguing by the Kunsthistorisches Institut in Florenz, Max-Planck-Institut
 Mario Sarto's sculpture in Italian Memorial Sculpture 1820-1940: A Legacy of Love by Sandra Berresford et al., (Frances Lincoln Ltd, 2004) .

Gallery

Works in the Ferrara Region of Italy, 1920-1930 

 For Sarto's sculptures in the Monumental Charterhouse of Bologna, check their external website Certosa di Bologna 

People from the Province of Ferrara
1885 births
1955 deaths
Brera Academy alumni
Art Nouveau sculptors
Pope Pius X
20th-century Italian sculptors
20th-century male artists
Italian male sculptors